Michael Schofield is a former US college lacrosse player and current coach. He is the head coach of the Pokagon Band of the Potawatomi Nation (MI, USA) and volunteers his time as an assistant coach at Portage Central High School (MI, USA).

Background
Schofield moved from his hometown of Portage, Michigan, when he was 10 years old with his parents Gregory and Charlene Schofield and older brother Andrew Schofield to Mendham, to New Jersey, where he was first introduced to the game of lacrosse. As a child, Schofield played from 5th grade through his senior year in high school, whereupon his graduation, he committed to Hope College (Holland, MI). As a high school senior, he and his team won a Division II New Jersey state championship against Princeton High School in 2010.

Time as a collegiate athlete
Hope College at the time of Schofield's admittance was a Division II MCLA club (lacrosse) program with aspirations of becoming a Division III NCAA lacrosse program. Schofield's accomplishments there were two MCLA All-Conference recognition awards (2011: CCLA 2nd Team All-Conference FOS, 2012: CCLA 3rd Team All-Conference FOS).

In 2013, Hope College's lacrosse program went NCAA, and Schofield's success continued; among the nation's elite among all DIII lacrosse players topping the nation's charts at 10th in the country for ground balls per game  (9.385) and 13th in the country for face-off win percentage (0.663). He was All-MIAA 2nd Team for the 2013 season and was a two-time MIAA Defensive Player of the week. In 2014, Schofield was ranked 18 for ground balls per-game (8.308). His face off win percentage for the year was 0.586. He was selected as All-MIAA 1st Team for the 2014 season and was also selected once in 2014 as the MIAA's Defensive player of the week.

During his two years of NCAA play, Schofield scooped 230 ground balls (Avg. GBPG 8.846) and won 352 of his face-offs (Avg. FWPct 0.622). As an MCLA Club lacrosse player, he scooped 148 grounds balls (Avg. GBPG 11.46) and won 290 face offs ( Avg. FWPct 0.742). His combined 4 years were 10.15 GBPG and 0.682 FWpct. Four-Time All-Conference, Three-Time MIAA Defensive Player of the Week.

Pokagon Band Potawatomi lacrosse 
Schofield is the head lacrosse coach and lacrosse director of the Pokagon Band Potawatomi. He coaches youth through adults on the modern rules and play of lacrosse while organizing and running lacrosse events for native citizenry. He has also volunteered his time as an assistant coach at Portage Central High School (MI, USA).

References
 NCAA lacrosse: 
 Hope College lacrosse:
 mlive.com:

Hope Flying Dutchmen men's lacrosse players
High school lacrosse coaches in the United States
Living people
Pokagon Band Potawatomi people
Hope College alumni
Year of birth missing (living people)